Mao Denda (傳田 真央 Denda Mao), also known as MAO/d, is a Japanese singer-songwriter. In 2018 she announced that she was suspending her musical activities.

Discography

Singles 
 "Mimimoto ni Iru yo... (Ring the Bells)" (2000/1/19)
 "Anata to Futari de (Be with Me All Day Long)" (2000/3/29)
 "Masquerade" (2000/6/28)
 "Happy Ever After/Soshite Me ga Sametara (3 Little Nights)" (2000/11/22)
 "Dakiyoseta Destiny (Dream of Asia)" (2001/6/27)
 "One Last Kiss (featuring Ai)" (2001/11/21)
 "Very Love −0.5℃" (2006/11/22) as MAO/d
 "Mizu no Inori: Joy" (2007/2/7) as MAO/d
 "Bitter Sweet" (2009/3/18)
 "Nakitaku Naru Kedo" (2009/7/1)
 "My Style" (2009/11/25)

Studio albums 
 Eternal Voice (2000/12/20)
 Diamond Kisses (2001/12/19)
 I Am (2009/12/9)
 Renai Chuudoku (2010/10/20)
 Semi Double (2013/2/13)

EP albums 
 Colors of Love (2007/12/5) as MAO/d
 Menz Collaboration (2012/9/5)

Remix albums 
 Mao Denda Remixes (2001/3/28)

DVD 
 Eternal Films History & Clips 1999–2001 (2001/10/24)

References

External links 
 

1980 births
Living people
Japanese women singer-songwriters
Japanese women pop singers
Japanese rhythm and blues singers
Musicians from Nagano Prefecture
Universal Music Japan artists
20th-century Japanese women singers
20th-century Japanese singers
21st-century Japanese women singers
21st-century Japanese singers